Roger Machado may refer to:
Roger Machado (baseball) (born 1974), Cuban baseball player
Roger Machado (officer of arms) (died 1510), English officer of arms
Roger Machado (footballer) (born 1975), Brazilian football player